Anitta: Made In Honório is a 2020 docuseries released on Netflix on December 16, 2020, starring Anitta, Lauren McFall and Arielle Macedo.

Cast 
 Anitta
 Lauren McFall
 Arielle Macedo
 Felipe Britto
 Daniel Trovejani
 David Brazil
 Renan Machado
 Paulo Pimenta
 Miriam Macedo

References

External links 
 
 

2010s Brazilian television series
2010s Brazilian documentary television series
2020 Brazilian television series debuts
Brazilian documentary television series
Portuguese-language Netflix original programming
Netflix original documentary television series